WAWZ (99.1 FM) is a contemporary Christian music radio station located in Zarephath, New Jersey. It is a listener supported/commercial radio station owned by the Pillar of Fire International. The station's target demographic is 25- to 54-year-olds. The Class B, 28,000-watt signal based in Bridgewater, New Jersey, serves the New York City market along with northern and central New Jersey.

The call letters for the station, like its AM counterpart, which went off the air in 1984, were chosen to honor Bishop Alma White, who was the founder of the Pillar of Fire Church and Zarephath, the community of license.

WAWZ began airing its current format as Star 99.1 on February 3, 2003. Its original format was traditional and classical music and church services.  In later years inspirational contemporary Christian music and mostly syndicated Christian teaching and talk shows were added.  In this format, its tagline was WAWZ - Your Voice of Faith and Inspiration. In 2017, WAWZ updated their slogan to "Uplifting Star 99.1," influenced by the overwhelming response of their listeners, who expressed how uplifting their music was for them.

History

WAWZ was founded in 1931 by Bishop Alma White and the Pillar of Fire Church.  Formerly headquartered in Denver, Colorado, the organization was given land in 1906 in Franklin Township, Somerset County, New Jersey.

The station was first assigned a frequency of 1350 AM, sharing time equally with three other stations, WCDA, WBNX, and WMSG. In later years, at 1380 AM, it shared time with WBNX in New York City. WAWZ was the second station owned by the Pillar of Fire Church. (KPOF in Denver was the first).

On September 1, 1984, WAWZ sold its part-time AM operation to New York station WBNX (now christened WKDM.) On WAWZ's final day, they produced a special program recalling the station's 53 years of religious broadcasting and, by electrical transcription, once again featured the voice of Alma White. With WAWZ (AM) gone, WAWZ-FM dropped the -FM suffix on October 8, 1984, becoming just WAWZ.

WAWZ-FM began broadcasting on August 22, 1954. The broadcast format was eighteen hours a day of classical music along with Pillar of Fire church services.  By the late 1960s, WAWZ had evolved into a Traditional Christian Music and Teaching station. They played traditional Christian music for about 6 to 8 hours a day. The rest of the time, they ran teaching and preaching programs by various Christian groups. They did not sell time in a traditional way but took a percentage of donations each ministry received from WAWZ's listening area. Overall, the format was similar to what Family Radio and BBN offered back then as well as being musically close. In 1980, there was a challenge to its license.  The challenge alleged that the station did not serve the public good. Allen Lewis was hired as the new program director, and it became a 24-hour station.

For many years WAWZ carried teaching programs, talk shows, church services, and traditional Christian music.  The station ran the tagline, WAWZ-Your Voice of Faith and Inspiration, and featured mostly syndicated evangelical Christian teaching and talk shows and inspirational music. Local news, AP World News, public affairs programs, and several call-in shows added a New Jersey feel to the station as it attempted to serve its license area it had just vigorously defended. Most of the schedule consisted of programming that came from area church services and outside ministries via the state-of-the-art Chicago-based Moody Broadcasting Service satellite subscription. Among these was a local program called Search Light which served tri-state area prison inmates. The station ran Share-a-thons twice a year to solicit support from listeners. During the 1980s, WAWZ began moving from a conservative format of traditional hymns to more of a Christian MOR format which included softer music by contemporary Christian artists as well as the traditional music they were playing. By 1990 the music mix was about half traditional and half contemporary. By 1994 the music format was nearly all contemporary. However, the majority of the schedule consisted of non-musical programming.

Major changes began on Thanksgiving Day in 2002. WAWZ began playing wall-to-wall traditional and contemporary as well as secular Christmas music. After Christmas, the station started airing hot adult contemporary Christian music with non-musical elements reduced to four hours per day. Finally, on February 2, 2003, WAWZ renamed itself STAR 99.1. The station also began selling time to commercial advertisers, but as it remains owned by a 501(c)3, they continue to have an annual "Radiothon". It has continued its all-Christmas format since 2002, playing mostly Christian-themed holiday music.

WAWZ's signal is among the strongest in NJ and can be heard through all of Central and Northern New Jersey and New York City and as far south as Ocean and Burlington counties, as well as Eastern Pennsylvania. With its polished family-friendly contemporary sound, Star 99.1 aims its programming at Christians and nonbelievers alike.

The National Religious Broadcasters honored WAWZ with Station of the Year awards in 2007 and 2008, and the National Association of Broadcasters honored them with the 2008 Crystal Radio Award for community service.

On August 1, 2014, Pillar of Fire began a lease of WLIR-FM. WAWZ-FM, Zarephath, New Jersey (STAR 99.1) was broadcast on WLIR-FM as well as its translators as STAR 107.1. The lease ended in April 2015, and WLIR-FM reverted to the Christian-formatted "Hope Radio" until early 2015, when the station was sold.

HD radio 
WAWZ broadcasts in HD Radio with both its HD1, HD2, and HD3 channels, providing Artist Experience data, including song titles, artists, and albums on compatible radios. Over the years, 99.1 FM has hosted a variety of formats on its HD sub-channels. The current HD sub-channel formats are:

 HD2 - Gospel songs (replaced Christian teaching subchannel in early 2016)
 HD3 - The Energy (Christian Rock / Hip Hop) (Launched in 2007 and launched to coincide with the station-sponsored annual youth festival, Autumn Blaze 2007). The Energy ceased transmissions in 2014 but resumed in early 2015.

Previous sub-channels 

 HD2 - Christian teaching (The eight-hour block of teaching programs, signing on first in April 2006, resembled the station's mid-1990s format, including the use of the former tagline, WAWZ-Your Voice of Faith and Inspiration.)

References

External links
 

FCC History Cards for WAWZ (covering 1953-1981 as WAWZ-FM)
FCC History Cards for WAWZ (AM) (covering 1927-1978 as WBNY / WAWZ)

Pillar of Fire International
AWZ
Zarephath, New Jersey